The Triple Crown Trophy''' is a silver trophy awarded to the winner of the United States Triple Crown of Thoroughbred Racing. The Triple Crown trophy has come to represent the pinnacle achievement in horseracing.  Commissioned in 1950 by the Thoroughbred Racing Association, artisans at the world-famous Cartier Jewelry Company were charged with creating not just a trophy, but a true work of art.  The result was a three-sided vase, each face equally representing the three jewels of the crown, intending to capture the spirit of horseracing's most sought after, and rarest, honor. The three sides are engraved with specific information from each of the three races; the Kentucky Derby, the Preakness Stakes and the Belmont Stakes. Upon completion of the first trophy it was awarded to the 1948 Triple Crown Winner Citation. Each year thereafter, retroactive trophies were presented to the first eight winners of the Triple Crown in reverse order until all of the previous winners or their heirs were awarded.

Today the Triple Crown Trophy is a permanent trophy awarded to the winner with information pertaining to each race engraved on corresponding sides.  When not on tour during the live running of the royal trio of races, the trophy is on public display at the Kentucky Derby Museum in Louisville, Kentucky.

In addition to the Triple Crown Trophy, winners of the Kentucky Derby are given the Kentucky Derby Trophy, a solid gold trophy worth in excess of $90,000; winners of the Preakness Stakes are presented the Woodlawn Vase in a national TV ceremony and given a solid silver replica worth in excess of $30,000 for permanent possession; winners of the Belmont Stakes are presented the August Belmont Trophy and given a silver tray for their permanent possession. Only five colts have been awarded all four trophies in the same year: Secretariat (1973), Seattle Slew (1977), Affirmed (1978), American Pharoah (2015), and Justify (2018).

Triple Crown Trophy winners

See also
August Belmont Trophy
Kentucky Derby Trophy
Triple Crown Productions
Woodlawn Vase

References

Horse racing awards
American horse racing trophies
Kentucky Derby
Preakness Stakes
Belmont Stakes
Triple Crown of Thoroughbred Racing
Churchill Downs
Pimlico Race Course
Belmont Park
Kentucky culture
Horse racing in Louisville, Kentucky
Horse racing in Baltimore
Horse racing in Hempstead, New York
1950 establishments in the United States
Awards established in 1950
Vase sports trophies
Silver objects